Muhammad Naimuddin (1832 - 1907/1916) was a  Bengali Islamic scholar, writer and journalist. He was the chief editor of the Akhbare Islamia.

Early life and education 
Naimuddin was born in 1832, to a Bengali Muslim family in the village of Shuruj in Tangail, Bengal Presidency. 

He completed his initial education at the Dulai Madrasa in Sujanagar, Pabna District and also completed Islamic studies in Dhaka. He later travelled through Murshidabad, Bihar, Allahabad, Agra, Delhi and other places to gain further religious knowledge. He was awarded the title of 'Alem-ud-Dahar' for his specialisation in Islamic knowledge.

Career 
Naimuddin had numerous careers in his life. He was a school teacher as well as a qazi (marriage registrar) whilst in Pabna.

He finally started concentrating on publishing magazines, writing books and spreading the message of Islam under the patronage of the Panni zamindars of Karatia.

The family employed Naimuddin as the editor of the Akhbare Islamia journal. Aside from that, he began working on translating the entire Quran into the Bengali language.

Works 
Naimuddin had written around 30 books relating to religion. The first volume of his translation of the Quran was published on 26 September 1891. From 1892 to 1908, he published the translation of 9 paras. In 1892, he also released a four-volume Bengali translation of the Fatwa-e-Alamgir with the assistance of Wajed Ali Khan Panni and patronage of Hafez Mahmud Ali Khan Panni. He was made the chief editor of the Bengali monthly Akhbare Islamia in 1883, published from the Mahmudia Press. These works were sponsored by the Zamindar of Karatia Hafez Mahmud Ali Khan Panni. Some of his other notable books include:

 Kalematul Kufr (1897)
 Esabat-e-Akher Zohar (1897)
 Adella-e-Hanifiyyah (1897)
 Ensaf (1892)
 Rafa-Yadayn (1896)
 Ma'dan al-Uloom
 Yusuf Surar Subistrirno Tafsir
 Sirat al-Mustaqim
 Seratul Mustaqim (New Edition)
 Dhormer Lathi
 Dhokabhavjan (1896)
 Bukhari Sharif (1898)
 Moulud Sharif (1895)
 Beter
 Tarabih
 Jubda al-Masail  (1873)
 Fatwa-e-Alamgiri
 Saheeh Shah Alomer Kiccha
 Saheeh Alomgirer Kiccha
 Saheeh Noorjahan Begomer Kiccha
 Saheeh Alauddiner Kiccha
 Saheeh Husain Shaher Kiccha
 Gokando
 Gomasta Darpan (1886)
 Go-Jiban (1889), in response to Mir Mosharraf Hossain's call for discontinuing sacrificing cows

Death 
There is difference of opinion as to what year Naimuddin died. Wakil Ahmed of Banglapedia claims it was on 23 November 1907 in his home village, while others say 1916.

References 

Bengali writers
1832 births
Translators of the Quran into Bengali
1908 deaths
People from Tangail District
Bengali Muslim scholars of Islam
19th-century Muslim scholars of Islam
19th-century Bengalis